Champ de Mars is a large public greenspace in Paris, France.

Champ de Mars may also refer to:

Champ de Mars (Paris Métro), a ghost station on line 8
Champ de Mars–Tour Eiffel station, a rail station in Paris
Champ de Mars (Montreal), a public park in Quebec, Canada
Champ-de-Mars station (Montreal Metro), a subway station
Champ de Mars (Haiti), a public square in Port-au-Prince, Haiti
Champ de Mars Racecourse, a horse race track in Port Louis, Mauritius
Champ de Mars: A Story of War, a 2009 play by Pierre-Michel Tremblay

See also
Campo Marte (disambiguation)
Campus Martius (disambiguation)
Champ de Mars massacre, a massacre during the French Revolution
De Mars (disambiguation)
Field of Mars (disambiguation)